The University of New South Wales (UNSW), also known as UNSW Sydney, is a public research university based in Sydney, New South Wales, Australia. It is one of the founding members of Group of Eight, a coalition of Australian research-intensive universities.

Established in 1949, UNSW is a research university, ranked 44th in the world in the 2021 QS World University Rankings and 67th in the world in the 2021 Times Higher Education World University Rankings. It is one of the members of Universitas 21, a global network of research universities. It has international exchange and research partnerships with over 200 universities around the world.

According to the 2021 QS World University Rankings by Subject, UNSW is ranked top 20 in the world for Law, Accounting and Finance, and 1st in Australia for Mathematics, Engineering and Technology.  UNSW is also one of the leading Australian universities in Medicine, where the median ATAR (Australian university entrance examination results) of its medical school students is higher than any other Australian undergraduate medical school.

The university comprises seven faculties, through which it offers bachelor's, master's and doctoral degrees. The main campus is in Eastern Suburbs in the suburb of Kensington,  from the Sydney central business district (CBD). The creative arts faculty, UNSW Art & Design, is located in Paddington, and subcampuses are located in the Sydney CBD as well as several other suburbs, including Randwick and Coogee. Research stations are located throughout the state of New South Wales.

The university's second largest campus, known as UNSW Canberra at ADFA (formerly known as UNSW at ADFA), abbreviated to UNSW Canberra, is situated in Canberra, in the Australian Capital Territory (ACT). ADFA is the military academy of the Australian Defence Force, and UNSW Canberra is the only national academic institution with a defence focus.

History

Foundation

The origins of the university can be traced to the Sydney Mechanics' School of Arts established in 1833 and the Sydney Technical College established in 1878. These institutions were established to meet the growing demand for capabilities in new technologies as the New South Wales economy shifted from its pastoral base to industries fueled by the industrial age.

The idea of founding the university originated from the crisis demands of World War II, during which the nation's attention was drawn to the critical role that science and technology played in transforming an agricultural society into a modern and industrial one. The post-war Labor government of New South Wales recognised the increasing need to have a university specialised in training high-quality engineers and technology-related professionals in numbers beyond that of the capacity and characteristics of the existing University of Sydney. This led to the proposal to establish the Institute of Technology, submitted by the then-New South Wales Minister for Education Bob Heffron, accepted on 9 July 1946.

The university, originally named the "New South Wales University of Technology", gained its statutory status through the enactment of the New South Wales University of Technology Act 1949 (NSW) by the Parliament of New South Wales in Sydney in 1949.

Early years 
In March 1948, classes commenced with a first intake of 46 students pursuing programs including civil engineering, mechanical engineering, mining engineering, and electrical engineering. At that time, the thesis programs were innovative. Each course embodied a specified and substantial period of practical training in the relevant industry. It was also unprecedented for tertiary institutions at that time to include compulsory instruction in humanities.

Initially, the university operated from the inner Sydney Technical College city campus in Ultimo as a separate institution from the college. However, in 1951, the Parliament of New South Wales passed the New South Wales University of Technology (Construction) Act 1951 (NSW) to provide funding and allow buildings to be erected at the Kensington site where the university is now located.

The lower campus area of the Kensington campus was vested in the university in two lots, in December 1952 and June 1954. The upper campus area was vested in the university in November 1959.

Expansion
In 1958, the university's name was changed to the "University of New South Wales" reflecting a transformation from a technology-based institution to a generalist university. In 1960, the faculties of arts and medicine were established, with the faculty of law coming into being in 1971.

The university's first director was Arthur Denning (1949–1952), who made important contributions to founding the university. In 1953, he was replaced by Philip Baxter, who continued as vice-chancellor when this position's title was changed in 1955. Baxter's dynamic, if authoritarian, management was central to the university's first 20 years. His visionary, but at times controversial, energies saw the university grow from a handful to 15,000 students by 1968. The new vice-chancellor, Rupert Myers (1969–1981), brought consolidation and an urbane management style to a period of expanding student numbers, demand for change in university style, and challenges of student unrest.

In 1962, the academic book publishing company University of New South Wales Press was launched. Now an ACNC not-for-profit entity, it has three divisions: NewSouth Publishing (the publishing arm of the company), NewSouth Books (the sales, marketing and distribution part of the company), and the UNSW Bookshop, situated at the Kensington campus.

The stabilising techniques of the 1980s managed by the vice-chancellor, Michael Birt (1981–1992), provided a firm base for the energetic corporatism and campus enhancements pursued by the subsequent vice-chancellor, John Niland (1992–2002). The 1990s had the addition of fine arts to the university. The university established colleges in Newcastle (1951) and Wollongong (1961), which eventually became the University of Newcastle and the University of Wollongong in 1965 and 1975, respectively.

The former St George Institute of Education (part of the short-lived Sydney College of Advanced Education) amalgamated with the university from 1 January 1990, resulting in the formation of a School of Teacher Education at the former SGIE campus at Oatley. A School of Sports and Leisure Studies and a School of Arts and Music Education were also subsequently based at St George. The campus was closed in 1999.

Recent history
In 2012, private sources contributed 45% of the university's annual funding.

In 2010, the Lowy Cancer Research Centre, Australia's first facility to bring together researchers in childhood and adult cancer, costing $127 million, opened.

In 2003, the university was invited by Singapore's Economic Development Board to consider opening a campus there. Following a 2004 decision to proceed, the first phase of a planned $200 m campus opened in 2007. Students and staff were sent home and the campus closed after one semester following substantial financial losses.

In 2008, it collaborated with two other universities in forming The Centre for Social Impact.  In 2019, the university moved to a trimester timetable as part of UNSW's 2025 Strategy. Under the trimester timetable, the study load changed from offering four subjects per 13-week semester, to three subjects per 10-week term. The change to trimesters has been widely criticised by staff and students as a money-making move, with little consideration as to the well-being of students.

In 2012, UNSW Press celebrated its 50th anniversary and launched the UNSW Bragg Prize for Science Writing. The annual Best Australian Science Writing anthology contains the winning and shortlisted entries among a collection of the year's best writing from Australian authors, journalists and scientists and is published annually in the NewSouth imprint under a different editorship. The UNSW Press Bragg Student Prize celebrates excellence in science writing by Australian high school students and is supported by the Copyright Agency Cultural Fund and UNSW Science.

In the 2019 Student Experience Survey, the University of New South Wales recorded the lowest student satisfaction rating out of all Australian universities, with an overall satisfaction rating of 62.9, which was lower than the overall national average of 78.4. UNSW's low student satisfaction numbers for 2019 was attributed to the university's switch to a trimester system. In the 2021 Student Experience Survey, the University of New South Wales recorded the lowest student satisfaction rating out of all New South Wales universities, and the second lowest nationwide behind the University of Melbourne, with an overall satisfaction rating of 66.9, which was lower than the overall national average of 73.

On 15 July 2020, the university announced 493 job cuts and a 25 percent reduction in management due to the effects of COVID-19 and a $370 million budget shortfall.

In October 2021, UNSW established Mentem by UNSW  to help organisations upskill and reskill their workforces. Mentem  helps organisation achieve strategic goals and measures completion and success rates through their bespoke insights platform. In September 2022 Mentem won Best in Class at the Australian Good Design awards  for the work with Department of regional NSW government, creating a learning program to uplift staff in digital literacy.

In May 2022, UNSW announced the university had received a $4.7 million in funding in order to pursue health prevention research. The funding aims to fund research on infectious diseases, drug and alcohol use and primary health care. Announced as part of NSW Health's Prevention Research Support Program (PRSP), the research is designed to support NWS research organisations conducting prevention and early intervention research.

Controversies

 Anti-abortion club: In 2012, a new club branded as 'LifeChoice UNSW' seeking to 'promote the dignity of human life from conception till natural death' came under fire for targeting women with its anti-abortion agenda. UNSW Women’s Officer Amber Karanikolas called out the club for attacking women's reproductive rights.
 Sexist chants: In 2016, a group of male students from UNSW's Philip Baxter College were called out for glorifying rape after they chanted "I wish that all the ladies were holes in the road, and if I was a dump truck, I’d fill them with my load", among other slogans.
 Activist censorship: In June 2019, a video surfaced showing UNSW management telling a student to stop handing out pamphlets over the 'Cancel Trimesters' campaign aimed at reversing the implementation of the university's trimester system. Posters in connection to this campaign were also removed from campus.
 Fox on campus: In June 2020, a fox at UNSW's Kensington Campus bit three students after they mistook the non-domesticated animal for a cat. The affected students were treated at Prince of Wales Hospital. Despite the incident, university students demanded for the fox to be the university's mascot. A petition started by Sydney Fox and Dingo Rescue to save any foxes on campus gathered 1400 signatures after UNSW threatened to remove the reported fox from campus.
 Racist Student Politics: In June 2020, UNSW student Claudia McDonnell who was a candidate in the UNSW Council Elections of the time, came into the spotlight after racist posts she made targeting Indians and blacks were exposed. McDonnell was also criticized for making transphobic posts and holding a sympathetic stance towards colonialism.
 Hong Kong social media post deletion: In August 2020, Australian Federal MPs criticized UNSW after it deleted a tweet calling for the United Nations to take steps to tackle Chinese aggression in Hong Kong. Chinese-Australian artist Badiucao also suggested that pro-democracy Chinese students were living in 'fear'.
 Research misconduct: In October 2021, UNSW launched an investigative review after claims of research misconduct on studies pertaining to ageing were made.
 Defamation lawsuit: In May 2022, Tharunka reported that a second-year Bachelor of Science student sued UNSW and two other students. The student claimed that UNSW had read and intercepted emails, and accused the university of referring him to NSW Police for trying to lodge complaints about two incidents from 2020.
 Monarchist intervention: In September 2022, Alexander Voltz, spokesperson of the Australian Monarchist League, said that UNSW should be 'embarrassed' over the UNSW Socialist Alternative's hosting of the event "It's good that the Queen is dead" in their expression of refusal to mourn the death of Elizabeth II, a symbol of British imperialism and colonization.

Symbols
The grant of arms was made by the College of Arms on 3 March 1952. The grant reads:
Argent on a Cross Gules a Lion passant guardant between four Mullets of eight points Or a Chief Sable charged with an open Book proper thereon the word "SCIENTIA" in letters also sable.
The lion and the four stars of the Southern Cross on the St George's Cross have reference to the State of New South Wales which established the university; the open book with scientia ("knowledge") across its pages is a reminder of its purpose. The placement of scientia on the book was inspired by its appearance on the arms of Imperial College London formed in 1907. Beneath the shield are the Latin words within a scroll: "Corde Manu et Mente" ("heart, hand and mind"), which when combined with scientia forms the Latin motto of the university: Scientia Corde Manu et Mente or 'Knowledge by heart, hand and mind'. Following the rules of English heraldry, the motto does not form part of the original grant of arms from 1952, and consequently does not require the formal alteration of the original grant by the College of Arms. The original motto of the university from 1952, however was Scientia Manu et Mente ("Knowledge by hand and mind"), which used the earlier motto of the Sydney Technical College (Manu et Mente or 'by hand and mind') from which the university developed. In 2021, the motto was changed with approval from the College of Arms to its current form to reflect the university's brand concept of ‘collective difference’.

An update of the design and colours of the arms was undertaken in 1970, which provided a more contemporary design, yet retained all the arms' heraldic associations. In 1994, the university title was added to the UNSW arms, as was the abbreviation "UNSW", to create the UNSW symbol that is used for everyday and marketing purposes. In late 2013, the university launched a new change to the business name used in all branding and marketing as "UNSW Australia". In January 2017, this was changed again to "UNSW Sydney", with the ADFA Canberra campus changed to "UNSW Canberra". The official name of the university, which requires an amending act of Parliament to the University of New South Wales Act 1989 to alter, is unchanged.

The ceremonial mace of the university is made of stainless steel with silver facings and a shaft of eumung timber. On the head are mounted four silver shields, two engraved with the arms of the State of New South Wales and two with the original-design arms of the university. A silver Waratah, NSW's floral emblem, surmounts the head. The mace was donated to the university by BHP and was presented by the company's chairman, Colin Syme, on 6 December 1962. A former NSW Government Architect, Cobden Parkes, was appointed as the first official mace-bearer.

Campuses

The main UNSW campus, where most faculties are situated, is  located on a  site in Kensington, Sydney. UNSW Art & Design is located in the inner suburb of Paddington.

The main UNSW campus in Kensington is divided geographically into two areas: upper campus and lower campus, which were vested to the university in three separate lots. These two are separated mainly by an elevation rise between the quadrangle and the Scientia building. Roughly 15 minutes are needed to walk from one end to the other.

UNSW Canberra at ADFA (formerly known as UNSW at ADFA), abbreviated to UNSW Canberra, is situated in Canberra. Its students are from the military academy known as ADFA, who are in training for the Australian Defence Force, and as such has an integrated defence focus, with particular strengths in defence-related, security and engineering research.

The university also has additional campuses and field stations in Randwick, Coogee, Botany, Dee Why, Cowan, Manly Vale, Fowlers Gap, Port Macquarie, Wagga Wagga, Albury, Coffs Harbour, Griffith, and Bankstown Airport.

Research centres
The university has a number of purpose-built research facilities, including:

UNSW Lowy Cancer Research Centre is Australia's first facility bringing together researchers in childhood and adult cancers, as well as one of the country's largest cancer-research facilities, housing up to 400 researchers. 
The Mark Wainwright Analytical Centre is a centre for the faculties of science, medicine, and engineering. It is used to study the structure and composition of biological, chemical, and physical materials.
UNSW Canberra Cyber is a cyber-security research and teaching centre.
The Sino-Australian Research Centre for Coastal Management (SARCCM) has a multidisciplinary focus, and works collaboratively with the Ocean University of China in coastal management research.

Venues and other facilities

A number of theatre and music venues are at the university, many of which are available for hire to the general public. The UNSW Fitness and Aquatic Centre provides health and fitness facilities and services to both students and the general public.

Governance

The university is governed by the university council, which is responsible for acting on the university's behalf to promote its objectives and interests. The council comprises 15 members, including the chancellor, vice-chancellor, president of the academic board, two members appointed by the minister for education, five members appointed by the council, three members elected by university staff and two student-elected members.

The principal academic body is the academic board, which receives advice on academic matters from the faculties, college (Australian Defence Force Academy), and the boards of studies. It is responsible for academic policy setting, academic strategy via its eight standing committees, approval and delivery of programs, and academic standards. The board comprises 59 members, including the vice-chancellor, members of the executive team, deans and faculty presiding members, members elected from the academic staff, and six from the student body. The board advises the vice-chancellor and council on matters relating to teaching, scholarship and research and takes decisions on delegation from the council.

The chief executive officer of the university is the president and vice-chancellor, currently Attila Brungs. The deputy vice-chancellors and pro-vice-chancellors form part of an executive team that are responsible for academic operations, research policy, research management, quality assurance and external relations, including philanthropy and advancement.

Each of the faculties has its respective board, which are responsible for the teaching and examining of subjects within their scope.

Academic profile

Faculties

The university has six faculties:

UNSW Faculty of Arts, Design & Architecture
UNSW Faculty of Business
UNSW Faculty of Engineering
UNSW Faculty of Law & Justice
UNSW Faculty of Medicine & Health
UNSW Faculty of Science
UNSW Canberra at ADFA

The university also has an association with the National Institute of Dramatic Art.

University rankings

In the 2023 QS World University Rankings, UNSW is ranked 45th globally (4th in Australia and 2nd in New South Wales) and ranked 28th in the world for research impact and quality (Citations per Faculty). In addition, UNSW is ranked 13th in the world for Civil and Structural Engineering (1st in Australia), 20th in the world for Accounting and Finance (1st in Australia), 14th in the world for Law (2nd in Australia), and 23rd in the world for Engineering and Technology (1st in Australia), According to the 2022 QS World University Rankings by Subject.

In the 2023 SCImago Institutions Rankings, UNSW is ranked 62nd in the World Overall and 48th in the World for Research: In its subject ranking for the same year, UNSW is ranked 9th in the World for Business, Management and Accounting, 9th in the World for Law and 25th in the World for Economics, Econometrics and Finance etc.

In the 2023 U.S. News & World Report Best Global University Ranking UNSW is ranked 37th Best University in the world and 45th globally in Economics and Business.

The Times Higher Education World University Rankings 2022 placed UNSW 70th in the world, and 46th in the world (1st in Australia) for Engineering, 55th in the world for Business and Economics (4th in Australia), and 24th in the world (2nd in Australia) for Law according to the 2022 Times Higher Education World University Rankings by subject.

In the 2022 Academic Ranking of World Universities, UNSW is ranked 64th in the world, 4th in Australia and 2nd in New South Wales. Also in 2022, UNSW had more subjects ranked in the Academic Ranking of World Universities than any other Australian university, with 21 subjects in the top 50 and 2 subjects in the top 10 in the world and ranked in more subjects than any other university in the world. UNSW had 10 subjects ranked first in Australia, including Water Resources (10th in the world), Civil Engineering (20th in the world), Library and Information Science (12th in the world), Remote Sensing (17th in the world), and Finance (29th in the world).

In the 2022 University Ranking by Academic Performance Field Rankings, UNSW is ranked 10th in the world for Commerce, Management, Tourism and Services and 18th globally for Business. In the 2022 Performance Ranking of Scientific Papers for World Universities, UNSW is ranked 44th globally and is also ranked 41st in the world in the Economics and Business category. According to the 2022 U-Multirank World University Rankings by the European Commission, UNSW is ranked 31st in the world for Research and also ranked 5th in Australia across Teaching, Research, Knowledge Transfer, International Orientation and Regional Engagement.

In the 2022 Korea University Business School Worldwide Business Research Rankings UNSW is ranked 1st worldwide for Finance, 13th in the world for Accounting and 20th globally for Management. In the 2021 University of Nebraska–Lincoln Global Research Rankings of Actuarial Science and Risk Management & Insurance, UNSW’s School of Risk and Actuarial Studies is ranked 1st globally. In the 2022 CFAR Rankings by Olin Business School at Washington University in St. Louis, UNSW is ranked 16th in the world for Finance and 11th in the world for Business by Total Outcome/Output Indicator of Research Excellence. In the 2022 Australian Financial Review Best Business School rankings of Australian Universities, UNSW is ranked 1st in Australia among 37 Universities listed. According to the Survey of Commercialisation Outcomes from Public Research (SCOPR) Summary Report for 2021, UNSW is ranked 1st nationally for the greatest number of startups and new spin-out companies with 14% of the national total companies established in Australia for that year.

In 2017, UNSW enrolled the highest number of Australia's top 500 high school students academically. UNSW has produced more millionaires than any other Australian university, according to the Spear's Wealth Management Survey in 2016. 

The Australian Good Universities Guide 2014 scored UNSW 5-star ratings across 10 categories, more than any other Australian university. Monash University ranked second with seven five stars, followed by ANU, Melbourne University and the University of Western Australia with six each.

Engineers Australia ranked UNSW as having the highest number of graduates in "Australia's Top 100 Influential Engineers 2013" list at 23%, followed by Monash University at 8%, the University of Western Australia, University of Sydney and the University of Queensland at 7%.

Selection and entry

Entry to a particular undergraduate degree program generally requires a certain Australian Tertiary Admission Rank, which varies by course. Some programs also take into account, in addition to a particular ATAR mark, performance in specialised tests, such as the Undergraduate Medicine and Health Sciences Admission Test for medicine and the Law Admission Test for law.

In 2019, UNSW had the most first preferences for high school students in the state of New South Wales.

The university offers a bonus points scheme, "HSC Plus", which awards up to a maximum of 5 points for performance in year 12 Australian Senior Secondary Certificate courses relevant to UNSW undergraduate degrees. The scheme does not apply to actuarial studies, law, medicine or psychology.

UNSW offers several scholarships and support programs to high achieving students. The Co-op program is a scholarship and industry engagement program awarded to students across many programs in the built environment, engineering, science and the Australian School of Business. Students usually enter the program after an application and interview while in their final year of high school. The university also offers Scientia Scholarships to a number of commencing students who performed exceptionally in the Higher School Certificate, which provide funding of $10,000 per year for the duration of the student's program.

UNSW also offers a mature age entry scheme, the University Preparation Program for students age 20 or older, that can provide the requirements for entry into UNSW or other universities.

Student life

Accommodation 
The university has a number of residential accommodation options, including Philip Baxter College, Basser College, Goldstein College, Fig Tree Hall, Colombo House, UNSW Hall, New College and New College Village, Warrane College; International House; Shalom College, and Creston College, and UNSW Village.

Study abroad
The university has overseas exchange programs with over 250 overseas partner institutions. These include Princeton University, McGill University, Penn State University, University of Pennsylvania (inc. Wharton), Duke University, Johns Hopkins University, Brown University, Columbia University (summer law students only), University of California Berkeley, University of California Santa Cruz (inc. Baskin), UCLA, University of Michigan (inc. Ross), New York University (inc. Stern), University of Virginia, Mississippi State University, Cornell University, University of Connecticut, Alfred University, University of Texas at Austin (inc. McCombs), Maastricht University, University of Padua, University College London (law students only), University of Nottingham, Imperial College London, London School of Economics and ETH Zurich.

Student projects
Students of the university are involved in a number of projects, including:
Sunswift Solar Racing Team, who hold the FIA world record for the fastest electric car over a  distance and in 2015 are creating Australia's first road legal solar car to adhere to Australian Design Rules.
 rUNSWift, the university's team in the international RoboCup Standard Platform League competition, is the most successful team in the world with wins in 2000, 2001, 2003 and 2014 as well as coming second in 1999, 2002, 2006 and 2010.
BLUEsat Satellite (development in progress)
Impact Engineers are a group of cross disciplinary humanitarian engineers aspiring to make a difference to the world's developing communities. Impact Engineers currently focus their efforts in rural Sri Lanka however over the next three to five years, they will expand to launch projects across multiple developing countries
 UNSW Redback Racing UNSW's entrant into the SAE-Australasia Formula SAE-A Competition (National winners in 2000)
 The MAVSTAR (Micro Aerial Vehicles for Search, Tracking And Reconnaissance) project to develop a team of cooperative micro aerial and unmanned ground vehicles.
 The Developing Country Project Second year thesis students doing Photovoltaic and Renewable Energy Engineering are able to get involved. The project aims to assist villagers in developing countries to gain access to electricity to satisfy their energy needs in a clean and sustainable manner.
 iGEM (International Genetically Engineered Machine) a worldwide synthetic biology competition. BABS UNSW entered their first team in 2015.

Arc @ UNSW Limited

Arc @ UNSW Limited is the student organisation at the University of New South Wales (UNSW) and is a not-for-profit public company.

In 2005, the Federal Parliament passed legislation making membership of student unions voluntary for the first time. This policy, known as voluntary student unionism (VSU), threatened the funding model behind the four UNSW student organisations with compulsory membership provisions.  A report commissioned by the university administration recommended that three of those organisations – the Student Guild of Undergraduates and Postgraduates, the University of New South Wales Union and the College of Fine Arts Students' Association – merge into a single student organisation, a structure in use at the University of Melbourne.
Arc was established on 15 August 2006 and launched early the following year, taking over the functions of three existing student organisations, the UNSW Student Guild, UNSW Union, and COFA Students' Association.

The organisation supports the activities of student clubs, student volunteer programs such as orientation week, student publications, two student galleries (Kudos Gallery and AD Space), and houses an elected student representative council. Arc operates the Roundhouse entertainment venue, the Graduation & Gift Store on UNSW's main campus in Kensington, and until recently, The Whitehouse bar and café which shut down permanently on 23 April 2021. Arc also operates a student support service, providing legal and academic advocacy. Arc@UNSW exists independently from UNSW.

Arc has three constitutional student bodies: 
 the Student Development Committee (SDC) – supporting clubs, volunteer programs, courses and activities, 
 the Postgraduate Council (PGC) – representing the postgraduate community at UNSW and 
 an elected Student Representative Council (SRC)

The student organisation is a major service provider on campus, running a number of retail outlets, student media such as Tharunka and an entertainment venue, the Roundhouse. The Arc Student Representative Council represents students to the university and nationally and fights for their rights. Arc also provides support and funding to university clubs and societies and runs student volunteer programs such as Orientation Week.

In 2007, the University of New South Wales Sports Association and UNSW Lifestyle Centre merged to become UNSW Sport and Recreation then later absorbed into Arc @ UNSW to become Arc Sport.  It runs the external sporting facilities and services and supports the 30 UNSW affiliated sporting clubs that compete both at home and abroad.

Blitz
Blitz is a student publication, published online by Arc @ UNSW, based at the University of New South Wales. Blitz under this name first appeared in session 2, 1988, but a similar "what's on" style publication had been issued by the then University Union since the early 1970s. Initially it consisted of a simple sheet or two of paper, but it evolved into a magazine style format in session two 1994 when a former editor from another student publication on campus, Tharunka, was hired to found a weekly "what's on" magazine. Blitz sometimes pays casual contributors for submitted articles and photographs, and employs a student online editor, a student designer, a student TV producer and a student radio producer.

Blitz typically covers the goings-on around campus and conducts interviews and publishes stories relating to current student activities. It widely publicises Arc services and activities on campus. Due to its non-partisan policy, it does not cover political issues, with the exception of voluntary student unionism. However, in 2004 an edition of Blitz was withdrawn by the student union because it contained a guide to rolling a joint. The editor Janet Duncan claimed there had been censorship of her editorial in the following issue. Arc @ UNSW announced that the organisation would continue to publish the magazine after the introduction of voluntary student unionism in 2007.

Tharunka

Tharunka, meaning  "message stick" in the language of the Aboriginal people local to the area, is a student newspaper originally published by the UNSW Students Union from 1953 until 1992, when that body was replaced by the University of New South Wales Student Guild. The Guild published Tharunka from 1993 until 2006 and the successor student organisation, Arc @ UNSW Limited, continued the publication of Tharunka from 2007.

Tharunka is managed by a small editorial team and actively solicits contributions from the UNSW student body. Including staff wages, the publication's budget is under $50,000 per year.

Engagement with secondary and primary school students 

UNSW engages with primary and secondary education, administering several national and international academic competitions for school age children. These include:
 The Australian Schools Science Competition – International Competitions and Assessments for Schools (ICAS) is conducted by Educational Assessment Australia, UNSW Global Pty Limited. UNSW Global is a not-for-profit provider of education, training and consulting services and a wholly owned enterprise of the University of New South Wales. It provides exams for students in Australia, New Zealand, Singapore, Brunei, Malaysia, South Africa, Indonesia, Hong Kong, India and the Pacific region. It caters to students from year 3 (Australia) through year 12, examining skills in English, mathematics, science, computers, writing and spelling.
 International Competitions and Assessments for Schools-Mathematics – International Competitions and Assessments for Schools (ICAS). From 2003 to 2005, ICAS-Mathematics was called Australasian Schools Mathematics Assessment. Prior to 2003, it was known as the Primary Schools Mathematics Competition and was targeted at primary schools.
 The UNSW School Mathematics Competition – Since 1962, the School of Mathematics and Statistics has run the UNSW School Mathematics Competition. This competition is a three-hour open book olympiad-style exam designed to assess mathematical insight and ingenuity rather than efficiency in tackling routine examples.  Competition results as used as part of the assessment criteria for some university scholarships awarded by the UNSW School of Mathematics and Statistics. 
 The UNSW COMPUTING ProgComp – Since 1997, The School of Computer Science and Engineering (UNSW COMPUTING) has run the UNSW COMPUTING ProgComp. This competition has the overall aim of raising awareness amongst high school students of the craft of programming and to encourage students to develop and apply their computing knowledge and skills.
  The UNSW COMPUTING Robotics Workshops – UNSW School of Computer Science and Engineering (UNSW COMPUTING) has developed specialised robotic workshops for school students. They focus on the use of the Lego NXT technology combined with the popular RoboCup Junior competition for schools. UNSW COMPUTING is also a national and NSW state sponsor of RoboCup Junior.

Educational Assessment Australia 
Educational Assessment Australia (EAA) is a not-for-profit organisation previously owned by the University of New South Wales. It was acquired by Janison Education Group on 31 May 2020. It is a national and international educational assessment organisation specialising in large-scale assessment programs including the International Competitions and Assessments for Schools (ICAS) in Australia, New Zealand, Asia, India, South Africa and the Pacific region. EAA also provides scanning, data analysis and reporting services to commercial and educational institutions.

Notable people 

Notable alumni include:

Scott Morrison, 30th Prime Minister of Australia
Gladys Berejiklian, former premier of New South Wales
Mark Bouris, CEO of Yellow Brick Road and television personality
Mike Cannon-Brookes, CEO of software company Atlassian
Bob Carr, former Minister of Foreign Affairs and former premier of New South Wales
Campbell Newman, former premier of Queensland
Roger Corbett, former chairman of the Reserve Bank of Australia
Glyn Davis, vice-chancellor of the University of Melbourne
John Deeble, architect of Medicare Australia
Tim Flannery, mammalogist, palaeontologist, activist and author
Lucy Turnbull, former lord mayor of Sydney and wife of the 29th Prime Minister of Australia
King Maha Vajiralongkorn of Thailand
Peter Garrett, rock musician, former federal politician
Rebel Wilson, actress, writer, director
Karl Kruszelnicki, scientist and media presenter
Sanghamitra Bandyopadhyay, First Women Director, Indian Statistical Institute and Padmashee Award winner, India
Marise Payne, senator for New South Wales and Minister for Foreign Affairs 
Bob Bellear, first indigenous judge
Mehdi Ghazanfari, Minister of Commerce of Iran
Charlie Teo, neurosurgeon
John M. Green, author, publisher and company director
Foo Mee Har, Singaporean MP and global head of priority anf international banking, Standard Chartered Bank
David James, former head of diabetes and obesity at the Garvan Institute of Medical Research
Betty Kitchener, founder of mental health first aid
Sussan Ley, Minister for the Environment, member of the House of Representatives
Robert McClelland, former attorney-general of Australia
Cindy May McGuire, Indonesian medical doctor, actress, 2022 G20 Ambassador, beauty pageant titleholder who was crowned Puteri Indonesia Lingkungan 2022, Miss International 2022.
King Tupou VI of Tonga
Jacqueline McKenzie, prominent Australian film, stage and television actress
Prince Mak, idol group member of Korean boyband JJCC
Hamid Mirzadeh, Iranian politician and academic who is the third and current president of the Islamic Azad University system
Glenn Murcutt, architect
Kerry Nettle, Australian Greens senator
Anne-Marie Schwirtlich, director-general of the National Library of Australia
Matthew Miles, CEO of MS Research Australia
David Wong Dak Wah, chief judge of the High Court of Sabah and Sarawak
Shaun Gladwell, visual artist
Richard Ferrero, microbiologist
Barbara Cleveland, contemporary performance artist
Ujjwal Maulik, Computer Scientist, Professor and IEEE Fellow, India
Pranav Mohanlal, Indian actor known for his work in Malayalam films
Mark Taylor, former captain of the Australian cricket team
Usman Khawaja, cricketer
Geoff Lawson, cricketer
Sam Chui, Chinese aviation blogger based in Dubai, United Arab Emirates
Del Kathryn Barton, visual artist
Mitchell Butel, actor and director
Kerry Chant, Doctor, NSW Chief Health Officer  
Sita Chutiphaworakan, Actor and Model Thai

See also
ARC Training Centre for Composites
Initiative

References

Further reading

External links 

 University of New South Wales

 
Universities in Sydney
Educational institutions established in 1949
1949 establishments in Australia
Group of Eight (Australian universities)
Universities established in the 1940s
Kensington, New South Wales